Hernán Giraldo Serna (born August 16, 1948), also known as the "Lord of the Sierra", is the leader of the Colombian paramilitary organization Tayrona Resistance Block, a 1,166-member armed group, part of the United Self-Defense Forces of Colombia. Colombian prosecutors have labeled Giraldo “One of the riches narco paramilitaries”. In the Justice and Peace process, he accepted responsibility for 35 acts of gender-based violence — some committed by his subordinates — including the rape of 11 girls ages 17. A Colombian court sentenced him to 20 years in prison for his role in the massacre of 20 workers; His son Cristhian Giovanni Giraldo Cadavid 27 years of age. Born in Colombia, raised in Brooklyn, New York. Living in Madrid, Spain, Was captured in 2017 with family members with over 28 million dollars. Colombian Authorities  Considered him to be one of the up coming biggest drug lords in Colombia if he partakes and takes control up after his father. He is also suspected in the murder of two narcotics agents and in the killings of Kankuamo Indians as part of his war against Marxist rebels, and the abduction of Colombian senator Jose Gnecco.

On February 2, 2006, he signed a peace deal with the Colombian government and demobilized his armed faction. He is expected to serve a prison time of 5 to 8 years, if he complies with the terms of the agreement. There are also outstanding warrants for his arrest in the United States for his role in the cocaine trade, but it is expected that part of his peace deal includes an implicit no-extradition pledge, as long as he doesn't violate any of agreement's terms. Hernan is one of the 14 criminals that have been extradited to the United States. According to U.S. DEA website, Hernan "pleaded guilty in 2009 to one count of conspiracy to distribute cocaine knowing and intending that it would be imported into the United States." However the website indicates he was not sentenced until Friday, March 3, 2017. He was sentenced to "198 months" (16.5 years) in prison. He was released from US Federal Prison on the 4th of January 2021, the Colombian Government immediately called for his extradition back to Colombia to face outstanding charges related to his time as a paramilitary leader. He was arrested on his arrival back in Colombia facing charges related to massacres, murder, kidnapping, rapes and drug trafficking.

The Tayrona Bloc was demobilized in February 2006, but some of its members, including some of Giraldo’s relatives, continued to commit crimes. Called El Taladro ("the drill"), some of Giraldo’s victims fear he will regain control of the Sierra Nevada de Santa Marta now that he is back in Colombia.

References

External links
 "War Without End", Media Awareness Project, May 21, 2001.

1948 births
Living people
Colombian people convicted of murder
People convicted of murder by Colombia
People convicted in absentia